The African Women's Handball Super Cup or Super Cup Babacar Fall is an annual international club handball competition run by the African Handball Confederation. It's between the winners of the Champions League and the Cup Winners' Cup.

The competition has been renamed so as to honour CAHB first chairman, the Senegalese Babacar Fall.

Finals

Winners by club

Rq:
GS Pétroliers (ex. MC Alger HB)

Winners by country

See also
 African Women's Handball Champions League
 African Women's Handball Cup Winners' Cup

References

External links
Super Cup Babacar Fall - cahbonline

African Handball Confederation competitions
African handball club competitions
Women's sports competitions in Africa
Multi-national professional sports leagues